Peta strana svijeta (trans. The fifth side of the world) is the fifth studio album released by the former Yugoslavia's Merlin band. The album was released in 1990.

Track listing

External links
Peta strana svijeta on Dino Merlin's official web site

Dino Merlin albums
1990 albums